This article details the qualifying phase for fencing at the 2016 Summer Olympics. Qualification was primarily based on the FIE Official Ranking as of April 4, 2016, with further individual places available at 4 zonal qualifying tournaments.

For the team events, 8 teams qualified in each event. Each team must be composed of 3 fencers. The top 4 ranked teams qualified. The next best ranked team from each zone (Africa, the Americas, Europe, and Asia-Oceania) qualified as long as it was ranked in the top 16. If a zone had no teams ranked between 5th and 16th, the best placed nation not already qualified would be selected regardless of zone.

For individual events with corresponding team events, the 3 fencers from the team event qualified for individual competition automatically. 7 more places were awarded based on the rankings (ignoring fencers from countries with team qualifications and considering only the top fencer from each country): the top 2 fencers from each of Europe, Asia-Oceania, and the Americas, and the top 1 fencer from Africa, qualified. 4 more places (1 per zone) were awarded through zone qualifying tournaments; only countries without a qualified fencer in an event were eligible to participate in these zone qualifying tournaments.

For individual events without corresponding team events, the top 14 fencers in the rankings (adjusted to include only the top 2 fencers per country) qualified. The next 2 best ranked fencers from each zone (but from different countries) also qualified. 10 spots were allocated through zone qualifying tournaments (4 for Europe, 3 for Asia-Oceania, 2 for the Americas, and 1 for Africa); only countries without a qualified fencer in an event were eligible to participate in these zone qualifying tournaments and each country could send only 1 fencer.

The host country was guaranteed a minimum of 8 quota spots.

Summary

Timeline

Men's events

Individual épée

Team épée

Individual foil

Team foil

Individual sabre

Women's events

Individual épée

Team épée

Individual foil

Individual sabre

Team sabre

References

Fencing at the 2016 Summer Olympics
Qualification for the 2016 Summer Olympics